Foolproof is a 2003 Canadian heist film directed by William Phillips and starring Ryan Reynolds, David Suchet, Kristin Booth, Joris Jarsky, and James Allodi.

Plot
Kevin, Sam and Rob are playing a game, known as "Foolproof", in which they create working plans to infiltrate and burgle various targets. They do not actually execute these heists, preferring to simply simulate them using necessary technical and physical abilities to carry out the tasks required for the heist. They adhere to some rules, such as using identical equipment and infrastructure as the target and using no firearms of any kind.

All is fine until a famous criminal, Leo Gillette, breaks into Sam's apartment, steals the trio's plans for a jewelry warehouse heist and accomplishes it. He then blackmails the group into designing and executing a plan to steal $20 million in bonds from a bank. Since he has evidence incriminating them in the plans, they accept.

Tension escalates within the group as Rob befriends Leo, while Kevin and Sam attempt to hinder his plans. They get the security codes to the safe and successfully switch the bonds. But the situation turns against them when Leo and Rob force Kevin into an elevator and crash it. When they go to retrieve the bonds, Sam shoots Rob, then Leo shoots Sam. With the three friends dead, Leo leaves with the bonds.

It is later revealed that the friends had switched Leo's gun, giving him one loaded with blanks. Sam and Kevin get up and are greeted by Rob. When Leo gets back to his place, he sees a fire started by the gang to destroy evidence against them and planted evidence against Leo on the latest burglary. Leo is taken in custody by Detective Mason, while the friends drive away in their car.

Cast

 Ryan Reynolds as Kevin
 Kristin Booth as Sam
 Joris Jarsky as Rob
 David Hewlett as Lawrence Yeager
 James Allodi as Detective Mason
 David Suchet as Leo Gillette

Production
The film was filmed in Toronto, Ontario, Canada, and produced by Alliance Atlantis Communications and Ego Film Arts and released theatrically on October 3, 2003, by Odeon Films in Canada and Momentum Pictures of the United Kingdom.

In Canada, it was released in 204 theatres, more than any other movie in the past. Under Telefilm Canada rules stating the film producers must have a good script and firm distribution deals to get a grant of more than C$1,000,000, Telefilm granted Foolproof C$3,400,000. The entire budget was C$7,800,000.

Reception
Chris Parry of eFilmCritic gave it 3 out of 5 stars and wrote: "The practice of Canadian companies and funding bodies unquestioningly funding any and all projects that Atom Egoyan signs his name to must end immediately. Not that this, his first foray into action thrillers, is necessarily the worst film of all time. In fact, it's actually quite enjoyable in parts. But the money blown on it could have funded eighteen smaller films that actually had a shot at the box office - or one close to this one, only which had the one secret ingredient needed to make a profit... an actual star."

Home media
The film was released on DVD in March 2004, including behind the scenes and special effects features, the theatrical trailer and outtakes. The package also contained a CD  of the soundtrack, with songs performed by The Crystal Method, The Dandy Warhols, Sam Roberts and Pilate.

In 2020, mobile phone company Mint Mobile, in which Ryan Reynolds had an ownership stake, made the film available to view for free, through a print from the ad-supported streaming service FilmRise, on the website mintmobileplus.com, purported as being part of a new streaming service launched by the company (a joke on the various streaming services, such as Disney+, HBO Max, and Apple TV+, launching or increasing in popularity that year, even having a logo stylized after the first service); the joke was that the film was the only program on the "service", being shown with various different thumbnails to make it appear as if it were different films.

References

External links
 Official Website
 
 
 
 

2003 films
2000s crime comedy films
2000s heist films
2003 independent films
2000s comedy thriller films
Canadian independent films
Canadian crime comedy films
English-language Canadian films
Films about friendship
Films directed by William Phillips
Films shot in Toronto
Canadian heist films
2003 comedy films
2000s English-language films
2000s Canadian films